Euphorbia hypericifolia (commonly known as graceful spurge, golden spurge, and chickenweed) is a species of perennial herb in the genus Euphorbia native to tropical Americas.

Distribution

The plant is native to Tropical Americas like most Euphorbias, the place where it is native includes Southern most parts of U.S, Mexico, West Indies, Central and South America.

The places where this plant is an introduced species includes Spain, Italy, Greece, Indian subcontinent, China, South Korea, Myanmar, and parts of Indonesia  as well as Subsaharan Africa.

References

hypericifolia